Southern Railway Passenger Depot, also known as Branchville Depot, is a historic train station located at Branchville, Orangeburg County, South Carolina. It was built in 1877 by the Southern Railway. It is a one-story, brick building with a stucco finish and hipped roof. It was the site of a speech given by President-elect William Howard Taft in 1909.

It was added to the National Register of Historic Places in 1973.

References

External links 
 Branchville Railroad Shrine and Museum (South Carolina Information Highway)
 Southern Railway Depot - Historic Branchville Depot - Orangeburg County

Branchville
Railway stations on the National Register of Historic Places in South Carolina
Railway stations in the United States opened in 1877
National Register of Historic Places in Orangeburg County, South Carolina
Former railway stations in South Carolina
1877 establishments in South Carolina